is a train station in Miyazaki City, Miyazaki Prefecture, Japan.

Lines

Layout 
The station, which is not staffed, consists of a side platform serving a single track on a sidehill cutting grade. There is no station building, only a shelter on the platform for waiting passengers. From the access road, a flight of steps leads up to the platform. There is no station forecourt and no parking available for cars but a designated parking area for bicycles is provided near the steps.

Adjacent stations

History
The line and its stations closed when the Miyazaki Railway ceased operations on 1 July 1962. Subsequently, Japanese National Railways (JNR) extended its then Shibushi Line north from  towards Minami-Miyazaki using largely the same route. The linkup, which included the reopening of several previously closed stations, was completed on 8 May 1963, and inc whereupon the route was renamed the Nichinan Line. Kouchiumi was one of several new intermediate stations which were opened on the same day. With the privatization of JNR on 1 April 1987, the station came under the control of JR Kyushu.

Passenger statistics
In fiscal 2016, the station was used by an average of 6 passengers (boarding only) per day.

See also
List of railway stations in Japan

References

External links
Kouchiumi (JR Kyushu)

Railway stations in Miyazaki Prefecture
Railway stations in Japan opened in 1963
Miyazaki (city)